Tuez-Les Tous is the first collaborative full-length album by American hip hop producer DJ Muggs and Haitian rapper Mach-Hommy. It was released on March 29, 2019 via Soul Assassins Records. Produced entirely by Muggs, it features guest appearances from Tha God Fahim, Big Cheeko, Kungg Fuu, Meyhem Lauren and Your Old Droog. The title translates to “Kill Them All” in English.

Critical reception 
Tuez-Les Tous was met with generally favorable reviews from music critics. At Metacritic, which assigns a normalized rating out of 100 to reviews from mainstream publications, the album received an average score of 83. The 405 reviewer wrote, "it's great when made with the intention to connect to an audience and bring forth the power of all kinds of voices. And you can't put a price on that". Mojo'''s critic wrote, "Peak-form Cypress Hill producer DJ Muggs unearths his darkest dungeon beats for imposingly confident New Jersey MC Mach-Hommy on a set of vivid, cold-hearted street raps. Meticulous and brutal". Paul A. Thompson of Pitchfork'' wrote, "So Hommy, whose work is rich with its connection to Haitian social and political history, and who seems to be in conversation with other artists long dead, is daring you to engage with it as craft before anything else, to marvel at the couplets before decoding them. It makes his music feel coolly, entrancingly mercenary".

Accolades

Track listing

Personnel 
 Larry "Muggs" Muggerud – arranger, mixing, producer
 Richard "Segal" Huredia – additional mixing
 Dave Kutch – mastering
 "Skinhead Rob" Aston – artwork
 Felipe Romero Jr. – design

References

External links 
 

2019 albums
DJ Muggs albums
Collaborative albums
Albums produced by DJ Muggs